Sirphire is a 2012 Punjabi film directed by Harjit Ricky. It was released on 10 August 2012 and was choreographed by Tejas Dattani.

Story
The film follows six friends, including Priyanshu Chatterjee as the son of a rich Punjabi businessman, and Monica Bedi as his love interest. When the group must deal with an evil and corrupt policeman, they realize how invaluable their friendship is.

Cast

 Priyanshu Chatterjee as Inder
 Monica Bedi as Simran
 Preet Harpal as Preet
 Roshan Prince as Bittu
 Binnu Dhillon as Happy
 Karamjit Anmol as Kala
 Gurleen Chopra as Jazz

Soundtrack

Soundtrack
Harprit Singh Kang

External links 
 Sirphire Punjabi Movie Information
 Sirphire – Movie Review

References

2012 films
Indian drama films
Punjabi-language Indian films
2010s Punjabi-language films
2012 drama films
Films scored by Jatinder Shah